Pacella is a surname. Notable people with the surname include:

Dave Pacella (born 1960), American football player
Elisabetta Pacella (born 1994), Italian field hockey player
John Pacella (born 1956), American baseball player

Fictional characters
Marco Pacella, a character in the television series The 4400